Sandesh Gadkari (born 16 March 1987) is an Indian football player who currently plays as a forward for Mumbai in the I-League.

Career

Air India
During the summer of 2011, Sandesh signed with Air India FC.

Salgaocar
Gadkari has completed his widely speculated move to Goa-based Salgaocar SC when he signed on the dotted lines to ink a two-year deal with Karim Bencharifa's army.

Air India return
After leaving Salgaocar F.C. after a not so pleasing term with the Goan club Gadkari re-signed with Air India FC in the I-League and made his return debut for the club on 30 December 2012 against now former club Salgaocar at the Duler Stadium in which Air India lost the match 4–0.

Rangdajied United
Gadkari made his debut for Rangdajied in the I-League on 22 September 2013 against Prayag United at the Salt Lake Stadium; in which he played till the 81st minute before being replaced by Joy Mrong Kharraswai; as Rangdajied lost the match 0–2.

Incometax Mumbai
Currently plays for Incometax Mumbai

Mumbai
Before the 2015–16 I-League, and after missing the entire 2014–15 season without a club, Gadkari joined Mumbai in the Mumbai Football League.

Career statistics

Club

References

External links
 Sandesh Gadkari at Goal.com
 

1987 births
Living people
Indian footballers
I-League players
Air India FC players
Salgaocar FC players
Rangdajied United F.C. players
Mumbai FC players
Footballers from Pune
Association football forwards
Pune FC players